"Shake Up Christmas" is a song by the American rock band Train. It was released on November 1, 2010, as the fourth single from their fifth studio album, Save Me, San Francisco. A different version of the song appears on the band's 2015 Christmas album, Christmas in Tahoe. The song was written by Butch Walker and Pat Monahan.

Music video
A music video to accompany the release of "Shake Up Christmas" was first released onto YouTube on November 29, 2010, at a total length of four minutes and one second.

The song features Coca-Cola's jingle of the period, most prominently at the beginning, while the video shows Santa Claus drinking Coca-Cola and shaking a snow globe. Clips from the video were spliced into Christmas Coke commercials during December 2010.

Track listing
 Digital download
 "Shake Up Christmas" (Coke Xmas Anthem) - 3:52

Chart performance

Certifications

Release history

References

External links
Official website

2010 singles
Train (band) songs
Songs written by Pat Monahan
Songs written by Butch Walker
Song recordings produced by Butch Walker
American Christmas songs
2009 songs
Columbia Records singles